The Pennsy Greenway is a rail trail in the Chicago metropolitan area running from Lansing, Illinois to Schererville, Indiana. The trail runs on the former Penn Central Railway, and is currently incomplete, but is paved at segments in Lansing, Munster, Dyer, Schererville, and Crown Point. The trail is paved through these segments at a total of 12.5 miles, and the trail is planned to extend for a total of 15 miles.

See also
 Cycling in Chicago
 Monon Trail
 Erie Lackawanna Trail

References

Rail trails in Indiana
Bike paths in the Chicago metropolitan area
Protected areas of Lake County, Indiana
Pennsylvania Railroad